San Ramon National High School is located at Barangay San Ramon,  Lagonoy, Camarines Sur province of the Philippines. This institution was established in 1967; the first administrator was Mr. Delfin O. Correo.

Achievements 

Ronel P. Bares - 1st Placer Regional Pop Quiz, Delegate Of The Bicol Region To The National Pop Quiz
Shara R. Froa- 1st Placer, Dagliang Pagbigkas.
Giselle B. Pilapil-1st Placer, Tagisan ng Talino

References

High schools in Camarines Sur